Doug or Douglas Williams is the name of:

People

Sports
Doug Williams (quarterback) (born 1955), American football quarterback, coach, and executive; Super Bowl XXII MVP
Doug Williams (offensive lineman) (born 1962), American football offensive lineman
Doug Williams (Australian footballer) (1923–2014), Australian rules footballer
Douglas Williams (cricketer) (born 1919), Australian cricketer
Doug Williams (wrestler) (born 1972), English professional wrestler

Other people
Doug Williams (bassist) (born 1969), American bassist for the bands Origin and Cephalic Carnage
Doug Williams (comedian), American comedian
Doug Williams (musician) (born 1956), American gospel musician
Doug Williams (polygraph critic) (1945–2021), American critic of polygraph tests
Doug Williams, an assembly line worker responsible for the Lockheed Martin shooting
Douglas Williams (sound engineer) (1917–1993), American sound engineer

Characters 
Doug Williams (Days of Our Lives), on the soap opera Days of Our Lives, played by Bill Hayes